Henri Mikael Hurskainen (born 13 September 1986) is a Swedish badminton player who competed for Sweden at the 2012 and 2016 Summer Olympics. Hurskainen has won several gold and silver medals in badminton championships. Hurskainen was born in Emmaboda, Sweden, to Finnish parents who had moved to Sweden in the 1980s.

Achievements

European Championships
Men's Singles

BWF Grand Prix 
The BWF Grand Prix has two level such as Grand Prix and Grand Prix Gold. It is a series of badminton tournaments, sanctioned by Badminton World Federation (BWF) since 2007.

Men's Singles

 BWF Grand Prix Gold tournament
 BWF Grand Prix tournament

BWF International Challenge/Series
Men's singles

 BWF International Challenge tournament
 BWF International Series tournament
 BWF Future Series tournament

References

External links
 
 
 

Swedish male badminton players
Olympic badminton players of Sweden
Badminton players at the 2012 Summer Olympics
Badminton players at the 2016 Summer Olympics
People from Emmaboda Municipality
1986 births
Living people
Swedish people of Finnish descent
Sportspeople from Kalmar County